William Campbell (1841–1921) was a Scottish Presbyterian missionary to Formosa (Qing Taiwan). He wrote extensively on topics related to Taiwan and was also responsible for founding the island's first school for the blind. Interested in the early history of the island (particularly the Dutch era), his knowledge of the time was such that he was called "without doubt the greatest authority on this subject living". He was probably the first European to see Sun-Moon Lake, which he named Lake Candidius in honour of the seventeenth century Dutch missionary George Candidius.

Mission to Taiwan
Campbell arrived in Qing-era Taiwan in 1871 to begin his mission in southern Taiwan, being stationed in Taiwan-fu, the capital of Taiwan Prefecture (modern-day Tainan) and serving both Han Chinese and Taiwanese aborigines in the area. He was a contemporary of Thomas Barclay, James Laidlaw Maxwell and George Leslie Mackay, who were all engaged in missionary work in Taiwan.

A strong supporter of "native ministers" (i.e. Han and aborigine clergy), Campbell wrote concerning one particular incident that

Campbell witnessed Taiwan's transition to Japanese rule. His mission lasted for forty-six years, until he left Taiwan for the last time in 1917 to return to his native Scotland, where he died in 1921.

Published works

 reprinted from

Notes

References

Presbyterian missionaries in China
Presbyterian missionaries in Taiwan
1841 births
1921 deaths
Scottish Presbyterian missionaries
19th-century Ministers of the Church of Scotland